Peruvians are citizens of Peru.

Peruvian may also refer to:

Relating to Peru
Peruvian culture
Peruvian cuisine
Peruvian dances
Peruvian Spanish, the family of Spanish-language dialects spoken in Peru

Other uses
Peruvian, a ship wrecked off the NE Australian coast in 1846, leading to the stranding of James Morrill
The Peruvian, a 1919 German silent film